Marko Obradović (born 30 June 1991) is a Serbian footballer who plays as a forward who plays for Metallurg Bekabad.

Club career
Born in Belgrade, SR Serbia, he played in the youth team of FK Zemun before coming to FK Partizan in early 2009. He played with the youth team of Partizan until summer 2009 when he begin his senior career by moving abroad to Belgium and joining K.A.S. Eupen where he played the following 2 years. After playing the first season in the Belgian Second Division they reached promotion and Obradović played with Eupen in the Belgian Pro League in the club's only season in the top tier.  However Eupen ended the season relegated and Obradović moved to another Second League club, Boussu Dour Borinage and played with them in the 2011-12 season. During the winter break of the 2012-13 season, Obradović moved to Bosnia and Herzegovina and signed with Premier League side FK Radnik Bijeljina.

On 13 February 2018, Yenisey Krasnoyarsk announced the signing of Obradović. On 16 January 2019, his contract with Yenisey was dissolved by mutual consent. On 24 January 2019, he signed with Belarusian club Torpedo-BelAZ Zhodino.

On 6 February 2020, FC Okzhetpes announced the signing of Obradović on a contract until the end of 2020. Subsequently, he had spells at Neftchi Fergana in Azerbaijan and Spartak Subotica in Serbia, before returning to Azerbaijan in January 2023, signing with Metallurg Bekabad.

International career
Obradović played for Serbia at 2008 Under-17 Euro. In 2010 he played two friendlies for Montenegro U19 team.

Honours
Radnik Bijeljina
Bosnian Cup: 2015–16

References

External links
Marko Obradović at Sofascore

1991 births
Living people
Footballers from Belgrade
Association football forwards
Serbian footballers
Serbia youth international footballers
Montenegrin footballers
Montenegro youth international footballers
FK Zemun players
FK Partizan players
K.A.S. Eupen players
R.F.C. Seraing (1922) players
FK Radnik Bijeljina players
FC Aktobe players
FC Yenisey Krasnoyarsk players
FC Torpedo-BelAZ Zhodino players
FC Okzhetpes players
FK Neftchi Farg'ona players
FK Spartak Subotica players
PFK Metallurg Bekabad players
Belgian Pro League players
Challenger Pro League players
Premier League of Bosnia and Herzegovina players
Kazakhstan Premier League players
Russian First League players
Russian Premier League players
Belarusian Premier League players
Serbian expatriate footballers
Montenegrin expatriate footballers
Expatriate footballers in Belgium
Montenegrin expatriate sportspeople in Belgium
Expatriate footballers in Bosnia and Herzegovina
Montenegrin expatriate sportspeople in Bosnia and Herzegovina
Expatriate footballers in Kazakhstan
Montenegrin expatriate sportspeople in Kazakhstan
Expatriate footballers in Russia
Montenegrin expatriate sportspeople in Russia
Expatriate footballers in Uzbekistan
Montenegrin expatriate sportspeople in Uzbekistan
Expatriate footballers in Belarus
Montenegrin expatriate sportspeople in Belarus
Francs Borains players